U Orionis (abbreviated U Ori) is a Mira-type variable star in the constellation Orion. It is a classical long period variable star that has been well observed for over 120 years.

Discovery

It was discovered on 1885 December 13 by J.E. Gore and initially it was thought to be a nova in the early stages of decline (Gore's Nova and NOVA Ori 1885 as still listed in SIMBAD), but a spectrum taken at Harvard showed features similar to that of Mira. Thus U Orionis became the first long period variable to be identified by a photograph of its spectrum.

Location
U Orionis lies less than half a degree east of the small-amplitude variable star χ1 Orionis and less than an arc-minute from the much fainter eclipsing variable UW Orionis. χ1 Orionis is slightly brighter than U Orionis at its brightest maximum, while UW Orionis is more than a thousand times fainter, similar to U Orionis at minimum.

Stellar parameters

If the Sun were replaced with U Orionis, its radius would extend beyond Mars's orbital zone (about 1.7 astronomical units).

Possible planetary system

According to Rudnitskij, a 12- to 15-year "super-periodicity" has been observed. The author infers such periodicity could coincide with the revolution period of an invisible companion, probably planetary. So far no clear hint of planetary objects has been detected.

References

Orion (constellation)
Mira variables
Orionis, U
M-type giants
039816
2063
028041
Durchmusterung objects